Jesús Garrido (born 30 January 1970) is a Spanish former volleyball player who competed in the 1992 Summer Olympics.
He was one of the Spanish best volleyball player´s during the 90s.
He was President of the Volleyball Madrid Federation. 
Now he is AEPSAD´s Head of the Educacion and Research Department

References

1970 births
Living people
Spanish men's volleyball players
Olympic volleyball players of Spain
Volleyball players at the 1992 Summer Olympics
Sportspeople from Madrid